Italy–Kosovo relations are foreign relations between the Italian Republic and the Republic of Kosovo.  Kosovo declared its independence from Serbia on 17 February 2008 and Italy recognised it on 21 February 2008. Italy has an embassy in Pristina since 15 May 2008. Kosovo will open an embassy in Rome. The two countries enjoy friendly relations.

Military

Italy participated in the 1999 NATO bombing of Yugoslavia, which resulted in a UN administration of Kosovo and then to eventual independence. Italy currently has 1,935 troops serving in Kosovo as peacekeepers in the NATO led Kosovo Force. Originally there was 5,000 Italian troops in KFOR. Carlo Cabigiosu was the 4th KFOR Commander from 16 October 2000 - 6 April 2001. Fabio Mini was the 7th KFOR Commander from 4 October 2002 - 3 October 2003. Giuseppe Valotto was the 10th KFOR Commander from 1 September 2005 - 1 September 2006. Also Giuseppe Emilio Gay is the current KFOR Commander since 29 August 2008.

Italy sent 600 Soldiers to serve as Peacekeepers in EULEX; an EU Police, Civilian and Law Mission in Kosovo.

See also 
 Foreign relations of Italy
 Foreign relations of Kosovo
 Italy–Serbia relations
 Albania–Italy relations
 Italy–Taiwan relations
 Italy–Yugoslavia relations

Notes and references
Notes:

References:

 
Bilateral relations of Kosovo
Kosovo